Johnson County Courthouse Square is a historic courthouse and town square located in Franklin, Johnson County, Indiana. The courthouse was built between 1879 and 1881, and is a two-story, red brick building with elements of Second Empire, Neo-Jacobean, and Romanesque Revival style architecture.  It has a low hipped metal roof topped by a central tower and with smaller corner towers topped with pyramidal roofs.  It was designed by George W. Bunting, who also designed courthouses at Frankfort (Clinton County) and Anderson (Madison County).

It was listed on the National Register of Historic Places in 1981.

References

External links

Historic American Buildings Survey in Indiana
County courthouses in Indiana
Courthouses on the National Register of Historic Places in Indiana
Second Empire architecture in Indiana
Romanesque Revival architecture in Indiana
Government buildings completed in 1881
Buildings and structures in Johnson County, Indiana
National Register of Historic Places in Johnson County, Indiana
1881 establishments in Indiana